Loesenera talbotii is a species of plant in the family Fabaceae. It is found in Cameroon and Nigeria. Its natural habitat is subtropical or tropical moist lowland forests. It is threatened by habitat loss.

References

Detarioideae
Flora of Cameroon
Flora of Nigeria
Vulnerable plants
Taxonomy articles created by Polbot